Aurora is a compilation album by American rock band Breaking Benjamin, released on January 24, 2020, by Hollywood Records. The album is a collection of reimagined versions of previously released songs, plus one new song.

Background
Details of the album were first reported in October 2019, that it would contain reworked versions of some of the band's biggest hits over the years. It also includes one new song, the lead single "Far Away" featuring Scooter Ward from Cold, which was released on December 6, 2019. The album also includes guest appearances from Lacey Sturm (formerly of Flyleaf), Michael Barnes of Red, Adam Gontier of Saint Asonia (formerly of Three Days Grace), and Spencer Chamberlain of Underoath.

Composition
Aurora makes use of acoustic guitars, orchestral strings and piano, resulting in an acoustic rock and symphonic rock sound. The album is also described as post-grunge
and retains hard rock elements on "So Cold", "Failure", "Red Cold River", "Tourniquet", "Never Again", and "Torn in Two".

"Dance with the Devil" is noted for "sounding more folky", and "Tourniquet" retains Benjamin Burnley's "aggressive growl" during the chorus.

Track listing

Personnel
Credits adapted from album's liner notes.

Breaking Benjamin
 Benjamin Burnley – vocals, guitar, producer
 Jasen Rauch – guitar, additional vocal engineering 
 Keith Wallen – guitar
 Aaron Bruch – bass
 Shaun Foist – drums

Guest artists
 Michael Barnes – vocals 
 Scooter Ward – vocals 
 Spencer Chamberlain – vocals 
 Adam Gontier – vocals 
 Lacey Sturm – vocals 

Additional musicians
 Carl Barc – additional orchestration
 Philip Dizack – trumpet
 Dave Eggar – string arrangements, orchestration, viola, cello
 Benjamin Fingland – clarinet, bass clarinet
 Jack Kessler – violin, viola
 Katie Kresek – violin, viola
 Sato Moughalian – flute
 Chuck Palmer – string arrangements, orchestration, conductor/leader
 Roger Wagner – string bass

Technical
 Dan Korneff – engineer, digital editing, and mixing; additional production 
 Sean Dorrian – additional engineering and digital editing
 Ted Jensen – mastering

Charts

References

Breaking Benjamin albums
Hollywood Records compilation albums